Henry II, Duke of Brunswick-Lüneburg, (before 1296 – after 1351), also called de Graecia ("of Greece"), was the eldest son of Henry I, Duke of Brunswick-Lüneburg and Agnes of Meissen.

On their father's death in 1322, his sons agreed to rule the Principality of Grubenhagen jointly; but they finally divided up the territory, and Henry did not receive a part, and instead took over the administration of the brothers' joint property.

In 1327, Henry joined Louis IV, Holy Roman Emperor, when Louis traveled to Rome for his coronation. Henry continued to travel to Greece and Constantinople, visiting his brother-in-law Emperor Andronikos III Palaiologos, and on to Jerusalem. Loaded with relics, he returned home in 1331. Apart from his travels, little is known about his life. Those of his sons who did not join the church obtained careers in southern European kingdoms; most notably Otto, who married Queen Joanna I of Naples.

Family
Firstly, Henry married Jutta (bef. 1302 – bef. 1330), daughter of Henry I, Margrave of Brandenburg-Stendal. They had the following children:
 Agnes (c. 1318 – bef. 2 June 1371), married Barnim III, Duke of Pomerania.
 Otto (1320 – 13 May 1399), married firstly Violante of Vilaragut, titular Dowager Queen of Majorca, and secondly Queen Joanna I of Naples.
 John (c. 1321 – aft. 4 December 1346), canon of Halberstadt.
 Louis (c. 1323 – aft. 26 May 1373), canon of Cammin.

Secondly, Henry married Heloise (aka Helwig or Helvis; died 1347/48), daughter of Philip of Ibelin, Seneschal of Cyprus. They had the following children:
 Philip (c. 1332 – 4 August 1369/70), Constable of Jerusalem; married firstly Helisia de Dampierre (they were the parents of Helvis of Brunswick-Grubenhagen) and secondly Alix of Ibelin.
 Riddag (c. 1334 – 1364/67).
 Balthazar (c. 1336 – aft. 14 January 1384), Despot of Romania, married Giacobella Caetani di Fondi.
 Thomas (c. 1338 – c. 1384), joined the Augustinians.
 Melchior (c. 1341 – 6 June 1381), Bishop of Osnabrück and Schwerin.
 Helvis, married Louis de Nores.

References
 Allgemeine Deutsche Biographie, vol. 11, p. 485-486

|-

|-

Princes of Grubenhagen
Year of death unknown
Year of birth unknown
Old House of Brunswick